Rainer Hennes (born November 9, 1942) was a West German sprint canoer who competed in the early 1970s. He won two silver medals at the ICF Canoe Sprint World Championships, earning them in 1970 (K-4 10000 m) and 1971 (K-4 1000 m).

Hennes also finished fifth in the K-4 1000 m event at the 1972 Summer Olympics in Munich.

References

Sports-reference.com profile

1942 births
Canoeists at the 1972 Summer Olympics
German male canoeists
Living people
Olympic canoeists of West Germany
ICF Canoe Sprint World Championships medalists in kayak